Lieutenant Colonel Thomas Colclough Watson VC (11 April 1867 – 15 June 1917) was a recipient of the Victoria Cross, the highest and most prestigious award for gallantry in the face of the enemy that can be awarded to British and Commonwealth forces.

He was educated at the King Edward VI Grammar School in Louth, Lincolnshire.

Details 
Watson was 30 years old, and a lieutenant in the Corps of Royal Engineers, British Army, attached to the Bengal Engineers, British Indian Army during the First Mohmand Campaign in British India when, on the night of 16/17 September 1897 in the Mamund Valley, North-West India, Lieutenant Watson and James Morris Colquhoun Colvin collected a party of volunteers (including James Smith) and led them into the dark and burning village of Bilot, to try to dislodge the enemy who were inflicting losses on British troops. After being wounded and driven back by very heavy fire at close quarters, Lieutenant Watson made a second attempt to clear the village and only gave up after a second repulse and being again severely wounded. An account mentioning him is given in Winston Churchill's "The Story of the Malakand Field Campaign".

He later achieved the rank of lieutenant colonel dying in London of illness contracted whilst serving in Mesopotamia during World War I. He was cremated at Golders Green Crematorium. His wife Edith was awarded the Royal Red Cross.

His medal sold at auction in December 2014 for £312,000. It was purchased by Lord Ashcroft, a collector of Victoria Crosses, and will be displayed at the Imperial War Museum.

References

Monuments to Courage (David Harvey, 1999)
The Register of the Victoria Cross (This England, 1997)
The Sapper VCs (Gerald Napier, 1998)

External links
 Biography
Royal Engineers Museum Sappers VCs
Location of grave (Golders Green)

1867 births
1917 deaths
Dutch military personnel
Royal Engineers officers
British recipients of the Victoria Cross
British military personnel of the First Mohmand Campaign
People from Velsen
British Army personnel of World War I
Bengal Engineers officers
Graduates of the Royal Military Academy, Woolwich
British Army recipients of the Victoria Cross
British military personnel killed in World War I